Eicher may refer to:

 Eicher (surname), a surname
 Eicher Motors (Eicher Group)
 Eicher tractor
 Eicher School, a school in the Faridabad district in the state of Haryana, India
 3617 Eicher, a main-belt asteroid

See also 
 Aicher
 Aich (disambiguation)
 Eich (disambiguation)